Naomi Yamamoto (born 31 March 1991) is a Japanese professional footballer who plays as a forward for WE League club Chifure AS Elfen Saitama.

Club career 
Yamamoto made her WE League debut on 12 September 2021.

References 

Living people
1991 births
Japanese women's footballers
Women's association football forwards
Association football people from Yamanashi Prefecture
Chifure AS Elfen Saitama players
WE League players